Nucleus was a British jazz-fusion band, which continued in different forms from 1969 to 1989. In 1970, the band won first prize at the Montreux Jazz Festival, released the album Elastic Rock, and performed both at the Newport Jazz Festival and the Village Gate jazz club.

The band was established by Ian Carr, who had been in the Rendell–Carr Quintet during the middle and late 1960s. Their debut album, Elastic Rock, and the next two collections, We'll Talk About It Later (1970) and Solar Plexus (1971), were all released on Vertigo Records, and music journalist Colin Larkin noted were "vital in any comprehensive rock or jazz collection".

In August 2005, a reincarnation of Nucleus with old and new members performed at Cargo in London. This was followed on 30 March 2007 by a Nucleus Revisited concert at London's Pizza Express Jazz Club as part of a series of concerts to mark the tenth anniversary of Jazzwise magazine. Nucleus Revisited included Geoff Castle, Mark Wood, and Tim Whitehead and on trumpet, as at the 2005 Cargo concert, Chris Batchelor. Although Ian Carr did not play due to ill health, he was present at the concert and received a standing ovation. On 4 August 2009, Nucleus Revisited appeared at Ronnie Scott's Jazz Club in London with Michael Garrick's Quartet as part of their two-week-long Brit Jazz Fest.

Members
 Ian Carr – trumpet
 Chris Batchelor – trumpet
 Harry Beckett – trumpet
 Kenny Wheeler – trumpet
 Bob Bertles – tenor saxophone, soprano saxophone, flute
 Brian Smith – tenor saxophone, soprano saxophone, flute
 Phil Todd – tenor saxophone, soprano saxophone, flute
 Tim Whitehead – tenor saxophone, soprano saxophone, flute
 Karl Jenkins – baritone saxophone, oboe, piano, electric piano
 Tony Coe – clarinet, bass clarinet, tenor saxophone
 Tony Roberts – clarinet, bass clarinet, tenor saxophone
 Geoff Castle – piano, electric piano, synthesizer
 Gordon Beck – piano, electric piano
 Dave MacRae – piano, electric piano
 John Taylor – organ
 Paddy Kingsland – synthesizer
 Keith Winter – synthesizer
 Allan Holdsworth – guitar
 Jocelyn Pitchen – guitar
 Ray Russell – guitar
 Chris Spedding – guitar
 Mark Wood – guitar
 Roy Babbington – bass guitar
 Rob Burns – bass guitar
 Jeff Clyne – bass guitar
 Mo Foster – bass guitar
 Joe Hubbard – bass guitar
 Billy Kristian – bass guitar
 Dill Katz – bass guitar
 Rob Statham – bass guitar
 Roger Sutton – bass guitar
 Ron Mathewson – bass guitar
 Neil Ardley – drums
 Tony Levin – drums
 Roger Sellers – drums
 Bryan Spring – drums
 John Marshall – drums
 Clive Thacker – drums
  
 Richard Burgess – percussion
 Chris Fletcher – percussion
 Chris Karan – percussion
 Aureo de Souza – percussion
 Trevor Tomkins – percussion
 Kieran White – vocals
 Norma Winstone – vocals
 Joy Yates – vocals

Discography
 Elastic Rock (Vertigo, 1970) (UK No. 46)
 We'll Talk About It Later (Vertigo, 1970)
 Solar Plexus with Ian Carr (Vertigo, 1971)
 Belladonna (Vertigo 1972, CD CD Linam Records)
 Labyrinth with Ian Carr (Vertigo, 1973)
 Roots (Vertigo, 1973)
 Under the Sun (Vertigo, 1974)
 Snakehips Etcetera (Vertigo, 1975)
 Alleycat (Vertigo, 1975)
 In Flagranti Delicto (Contemp, 1977)
 Out of the Long Dark (Capitol, 1979)
 Awakening (Mood, 1980)
 Jazz London 29/30 with Brian Lemon (BBC, 1983)
 Live at the Theaterhaus (Mood, 1985)
 Live in Bremen (Cuneiform, 2003)
 The Pretty Redhead (Hux, 2003)
 Hemispheres (Hux, 2006)
 UK Tour '76 (Major League 2006)
 Live 1970 with Leon Thomas (Gearbox, 2014)
 Three of a Kind with Ian Carr (Gonzo, 2015)
 Bracknell Sunshine with Ian Carr (Gonzo, 2016)
 Live At The BBC 13-CD box-set (Repertoire, 2021)

References

External links
 Ian Carr and Nucleus website
 Article about Nucleus at All About Jazz
 Article about Ian Carr at All About Jazz
 Article about Nucleus at Prog Archives

British rock music groups
British jazz-rock groups
Vertigo Records artists
Musical groups established in 1969
Musical groups disestablished in 1989
1969 establishments in the United Kingdom
1989 disestablishments in the United Kingdom